Historically the flagship brand for Great Wall Motors with a varied set offerings, GWM now primarily represents as the light truck marque for its parent brand.

GWM Trucks

Current 

 Great Wall Wingle 5 (2010-present)
 Great Wall Wingle 7 (2018-present)
 Great Wall Cannon (2019-present)
 Great Wall King Kong Cannon (2022-present)

Concept 

 Great Wall X-PAO

Discontinued 

 Great Wall Wingle 3 (2006-2010)
Great Wall Wingle 6 (2014-2021)

Great Wall (pre-GWM)

Concept 

 Great Wall CHC011
 Great Wall Hover H7
 Great Wall Hover M3
 Great Wall Voleex C70
 Great Wall Wingle CL

Upcoming

GWM SALOON 

 Salon Jialong
 Saloon Tech
 Saloon Mecha Dragon

Discontinued

Great Wall 

 Great Wall Proteus (????-????)
 Great Wall Deer (1996-2013)
 Great Wall Sailor (2001-2009) 
 Great Wall Safe (2002-2009)
 Great Wall Pegasus (2003-2008)
 Great Wall Sing (2003-2008)
 Great Wall SoCool (2003-2010)
 Great Wall Peri (2008-2010)
 Great Wall Florid (2008-2013)
 Great Wall Coolbear (2009-2015)

Haval/Hover 

 Great Wall Haval H3 (2005-2012) 
 Great Wall Haval M1
 Great Wall Haval M2
 Great Wall Haval M4 (2012-2013)

Voleex 
Great Wall Voleex C10 (2010-2014)
Great Wall Voleex C20R
 Great Wall Voleex C30 (2010-2016)
Great Wall Voleex C50 (2012-2016)
Great Wall Cowry/Voleex V80 (2007-2015)

References

Automotive industry in China